Jabłkowski Brothers is a Polish trading company, known for its group of high-end department stores in pre-war Poland.  The Warsaw store was the very first department store in Poland.

Founded in 1884 in Warsaw by Aniela Jabłkowska, from 1892 it was a Jabłkowski family business. Initially run by Aniela, the company specialized in the trade of various goods, mostly clothes. In 1897, it was taken over by Aniela's brother Józef Jabłkowski. It was Józef who expanded the business significantly, moving it to a larger building in 1900 and in 1913 the Towarzystwo Akcyjne Bracia Jabłkowscy company entered the stock exchange. Initially owning a group of smaller shops all around Russian-held Poland, in 1914 the company built the first of its large department stores in downtown Warsaw, at Bracka Street. In 1919, after World War I, the company opened another store in Mickiewicz Street, the main avenue of Wilno.

The Warsaw-based store was the largest shop in Poland and both stores were considered to be among the most luxurious and reputable in Poland, much like their foreign counterparts, Galeries Lafayette, Harrods or Selfridges. There were tourist attractions of both cities. The company dealt with garments, underwear, textiles, silk, bedding, china, perfumes, as well as shoes, furs and articles for daily use. In addition, both stores housed art galleries and small cinemas.

After the outbreak of the Polish Defensive War of 1939 Wilno was seized by the Soviets, who confiscated the shop and transported most of its goods to the Soviet Union. The store in Warsaw was initially closed by the new German administration. It was reopened in February 1940, but its turnover was seriously restricted by the limits on the textile trade. After the outbreak of the Warsaw Uprising of 1944, the store at Bracka street became one of the arsenals for the Armia Krajowa. Damaged and burnt, the building survived World War II and in May  1945 the business was reopened. Despite severe shortages of practically everything, the staff gradually rose to 220 and the turnover reached half of the pre-war level. It also served as an UNRRA aid distribution point. However, during the so-called 'battle for trade', on May 15, 1950, the communist authorities confiscated the shop and closed it down the following year.

Since then the building has housed a variety of state-owned shops, including the Central House of a Child dealing with toys and children's wear (1951–1970) and then, since 1992, the Arka store. Despite being non-existent, the brand remained well known in post-war Poland and was a symbol of pre-war luxury and quality. After Poland regained its independence from the Eastern Bloc in 1989, the heirs of the Jabłkowski family started their efforts to regain the building and reopen the store. In 1996 a court verdict declared the decisions of the communist tribunals null and void, and the future of the building was discussed.  The Court supported the right to ownership by the Jabłkowscy family.  On September 11, 2013, Jabłkowski brothers Jan and Tomasz (grandsons of Józef), Marta and Magda (daughters of Jan Jabłkowski) entered the building following a court verdict.  They were accompanied by solicitors, film crew, carpenters and locksmiths as well as twenty-six security officers.  Jan Jabłkowski, aided by his family, had struggled for the return of the family's celebrated department store since the fall of Communism in 1989.

Since the return of the store in 2013, the family has been working closely with architects, conservationists and planners to modernise the facilities in the historic building whilst retaining the iconic stained-glass windows and the atrium area. Potential companies are being examined so that store will be able to offer, yet again, a unique retail experience for its customers.
The opening date for the store is to be confirmed.

External links
 Dom Towarowy Bracia Jabłkowscy
  Naprzód, przodkowie, Polityka, 29 May 2007

References

 
 

Retail companies established in 1884
Department stores of Poland
Buildings and structures in Vilnius
Buildings and structures in Warsaw
Tourist attractions in Warsaw
Commercial buildings completed in 1914
1884 establishments in Poland